The Old Faithful Historic District in Yellowstone National Park comprises the built-up portion of the Upper Geyser Basin surrounding the Old Faithful Inn and Old Faithful Geyser. It includes the Old Faithful Inn, designed by Robert Reamer and is itself a National Historic Landmark, the upper and lower Hamilton's Stores, the Old Faithful Lodge, designed by Gilbert Stanley Underwood, the Old Faithful Snow Lodge, and a variety of supporting buildings.  The Old Faithful Historic District itself lies on the 140-mile Grand Loop Road Historic District.

A notable missing portion of the district is the Old Faithful Museum of Thermal Activity, which formed part of the trailside museum group that includes the Madison Museum, Norris Museum and Fishing Bridge Museum, all listed as National Historic Landmarks. The Old Faithful Museum was torn down in 1971 to make way for the Mission 66 visitor center, which in turn has been replaced by the Old Faithful Visitor Education Center.

Buildings in the historic district
 The following descriptions are derived from the November 2, 1982 nomination application.

The district is dominated by the Old Faithful Inn and consists of the Old Faithful Lodge, 3 stores, 2 service stations, 5 dormitories, 10 support buildings, and the guest cabins behind the Old Faithful Lodge and the Snow Lodge.

The first 11 buildings listed are of similar architectural style to the Old Faithful Inn and retain their architectural and historical integrity. The following 11 buildings: have historical significance as support buildings and they are compatible with the historic scene.  The cabins have historical significance and do reflect the type of cabin construction in Yellowstone National Park. While the cabins in the Old Faithful Lodge still retain
some architectural integrity, the cabins behind the Snow Lodge have been altered considerably and have lost their architectural integrity.
 Building #2337 - Old Faithful Lodge. Construction began in 1923 with several additions made through 1927. The irregular plan building is of frame construction with stone masonry walls, wood-shingled exterior siding, and half log decorative elements. The lodge is approximately 28 feet long with a  extension, a  extension, and a  extension plus another  wing along the east side. The windows are casement and double hung. Stepped stone masonry columns and large log poles support the porte-cochère and other covered porches. Stepped stone masonry pilasters are used at some corners. The 19-room building has a wood-shingled, gable roof with a monitored roof over the recreation hall. Exposed log rafter ends and log brackets are used.
 Building #2306 - Powerhouse and Laundry. Built in 1929 by the Yellowstone Park Company, the one-story, two-room L-shaped frame structure with wood-shingle exterior siding on concrete foundation has a wood-shingled gable roof with louvered type windows. The building has exposed log rafter ends. This building is scheduled to be reduced in size if laundry facilities are park centralized.
 Building #2310 - Caretaker's Quarters. Built in the late 1920s, the -story building has four rooms. The approximately  rectangular frame structure on concrete foundation has wood-shingle exterior siding and a wood-shingled gable roof with a transverse hip at one elevation. The windows are both double hung and casement. The building has exposed log rafter ends. The building is now the winter keeper's residence.
 Building #2311 - Laundry Manager's Residence. Built in 1926, the approximately  rectangular plan frame one-story structure has two rooms. The building has wood-shingle exterior siding and a wood-shingled gable roof with a transverse gable roof and casement window. The roof has exposed log rafter ends and large ridge poles which are compatible to the Old Faithful Inn.
 Building #2302 - Lower Service Station. This building was built by the Hamilton Store Company at an unknown date. The exterior walls are horizontal siding with vertical half-timbers. The roof is wood-shingled and extends over the gas pumps. Hamilton stores, Inc., and the National Park Service each have joint ownership of the building.
 Building #2303 - Lower Hamilton Store. Built as Klamer Store in 1894 and sold to Charles Hamilton in 1914. Hamilton expanded the store over the years. The modified U-plan is two-story with 13 rooms plus baths. The frame constructed building has novelty siding and a wood-shingled gabled roof with several transverse gables. Burled branches and logs are used as brackets and decorative elements on the north and east elevations. An unusual element is the use of the burled wood in spelling out HAMILTON STORES which hangs over the entrance to the salesroom. The interior is typical store design of the time, but the second floor contains a small sitting room called "The Million Dollar Room," papered with canceled checks whose total is $1,000,000. This fact is reportedly recorded in Ripley's Believe It or Not. Hamilton Stores, Inc., and the National Park Service have joint ownership of the building.
 Building #2780 - Photo Shop. The two-story, 25-room store is of frame construction with half-log and shiplap siding. A porch extends across the front of the building. The wood-shingled gabled roof has exposed log rafter ends. The store reflects the concession architecture in Yellowstone National Park during the 1920s and 1930s. The building was moved to its present location in 1971.
 Building #2326 - Upper Hamilton Store. Built in 1929 by Hamilton Stores, Inc., as a store and employee dormitory. The windows are both casement and double hung sash. The walls are constructed of concrete laid to resemble hewn logs. The building is placed on a masonry stone foundation with stepped stone masonry pilasters and stepped stone masonry columns that support the two covered entrance porches. The eaves of the wood-shingled gabled roof are wood-shingled with exposed log rafter ends; log rafter purlins are used in the roof structure of the two covered entrance porches. The tips of the log rafter ends and the purlins are tapered and whittled to resemble beaver gnawnings. The building was originally part of the Old Faithful Auto Camp. Hamilton Stores, Inc., and the National Park Service each have joint ownership of the building.
 Building #2327 - Upper Gas Station. Built in 1929 by Hamilton Stores, Inc., the Latin Cross plan structure has two rooms with three of the wings canopied over the gas pumps. The walls are of concrete construction laid to resemble hewn logs. Stepped stone masonry pilasters are used at the corners, similar stone columns support the canopies. The gabled roof has wood shingles and exposed log rafter ends. The structure has casement windows. Hamilton Stores, Inc., and the National Park Service each have joint ownership of the building.
 Building #2305 - Old Faithful Inn. The Old Faithful Inn was listed on the National Register of Historic Places, July 23, 1973. Herein specifically, the nomination will be expanded to include the following interior spaces: the dining room, the lobby, Rooms 10, 127, 154, and 229. The rustic log quality of the exterior is carried throughout the interior. The lobby, a 64-foot-square space rising 85 feet to the ridgeline, is encircled with tiers of balconies used as lounges for the guests. The use of exposed logs for the ceilings, walls, the purlins and rafters are further accented by the use of vertical log supports of the second and third floor balconies and for the small open room near the ceiling called the "Crow's Nest." In earlier days, the "Crow's Nest" was used by musicians as a place to assemble and entertain the guests far below. The lobby is further enhanced by the lighting effect produced by the many glass dormer windows placed in the steep gabled roof. An immense 16-foot-square native stone fireplace with hearths on each of its four sides dominates one corner of the lobby. Tons of local stone were used in the construction of the fireplace. The fireplace towers to the ceiling. Suspended from the ceilings in the lobby and dining room are copper light fixtures designed by the Inn's architect, Robert Reamer. Imitation candlesticks, also designed by Reamer, are mounted on the log columns and form sconces on the log walls. The original log-walled dining room is open to the roof with the log ceiling supported by log scissor trusses. A massive rock fireplace, modified after the 1959 earthquake, centers on the south wall. In 1921, the south wall ground level windows were removed to install doorways for a new dining room addition. In 1927, a multisided addition was made to the east wall of the original dining room. The original wall was removed and replaced with three support columns and panels. Interesting and significant elements of the room and the 1921 dining room addition are the arabesque on the fir panels, the spare columns, and the frieze. The etched designs are of flora and fauna and are the only rustic touches in the room. The room was converted to "The Bear Pit" a more formal cocktail lounge in 1962. Room No. 10, off the west corridor on the first floor, is one of the original rooms with modified bathroom intact. The ceiling has the original end-to-end shingle covering. The adjoining bathroom has the original high tank oak toilet, clawfoot bathtub, and red marble lavatory. Linoleum covers the original fir flooring. Other typical hotel rooms with rustic qualities are No. 127 and No. 154, on the second floor, and No. 229, on the third floor. The walls and ceilings are rough-sawn pine. Room No. 127 has an adjoining bath with tongue and groove walls and original high tank toilet, clawfoot bathtub and white marble lavatory. Room No. 154 has wooden casement windows and a seating nook on the north window. Room No. 229 is similar to Room No. 154, but larger size. Part of the room is the opening provided by the dormer window. All of the rooms have non-historic lavatories added in the 1930s–1940s. The stairway in the west wing should be cited, the half-log stair and tread and gnarled railings, Original furnishings in the Old Faithful Inn are significant components of the building and the collection is a good representation from the Arts and Crafts Movement. In the public spaces are two or three styles of loose cushioned settees, arm chairs, rockers, and wing back chairs, octagonal base tables with leather tops and brass studded trim, and writing desks and chairs. These pieces of Mission Furniture probably came from a manufacturer in upstate New York. The dining room is still furnished with the natural hickory side chairs of rustic style from the Old Hickory Furniture Company. The Bear Pit has leather topped tables with brass studs. Some bedrooms have iron bedsteads with a brass printed finish, dresser with drop front drawers and wash stand stained green with copper tops.
 Building #2312 - Girl's Dormitory. It is of frame construction with exterior wood-shingle siding and wood-shingled mansard roof. The building is similar in design to the 1913 addition to the Old Faithful Inn.
 Building #2307 – Shop.
 Building #2309 - Shed. Built in late 1920s, the one-room  frame structure has wood-shingle exterior siding with wood-shingled hip roof and exposed log rafter ends.
 Building #2313 - Employees Laundry. Built in late 1920s, the rectangular  two-room, frame structure has wood-shingle exterior siding and wood-shingled gable roof.
 Building #2314 - U-Plan Dormitory. The building is of frame construction with half-timber and shingle exterior siding. The one-story building has 8 rooms. The wood-shingled gable roof has exposed log rafter ends.
 Building #2315 - Engineers Dormitory. The structure has exterior wood-shingle siding, exposed log rafter ends and a wood-shingled roof with a transverse gable along its length.
 Building #2316 - Employee's Dormitory. The building has wood-shingle exterior siding and a wood-shingled gable roof with exposed rafter ends. The building reflects the design and construction of the Old Faithful Inn. The dormitory was built by the Yellowstone Park Company as a service building for the Inn. It is now used as a recreation facility for employees.
 Building #2338 - Linen Room. The exterior has exposed log studs and shiplap siding; the gabled roof is wood shingled. The building is east of the Old Faithful Lodge's north wing. The upper floor is used as a dorm and the lower floor is used as a linen storage for the cabins in the lodge area.
 Building #2339 - Power Plant and Boiler House. The building has a half-timbered and wood-shingled exterior and a wood-shingled gable roof. The building is on a concrete foundation. The two buildings shown on the site plan (just north of building #2338) are 4-plex facilities built ca. 1930.
 Building #2343 - Dormitory (Cinderella Dorm). The exterior is half-timbered and plywood. The two-story structure, on concrete foundation, has a wood-shingle gabled roof. The building is east of the lodge.

Gallery

See also
 Fort Yellowstone
 Grand Loop Road Historic District
 Lake Fish Hatchery Historic District
 Mammoth Hot Springs Historic District
 North Entrance Road Historic District
 Roosevelt Lodge Historic District

References

External links

Architecture of Yellowstone: A Microcosm of American Design, National Park Service
Old Faithful Historic District at the Wyoming State Historic Preservation Office
Old Faithful Inn, Caretaker's Residence, Old Faithful, Teton, WY at the Historic American Buildings Survey (HABS)
Old Faithful Inn, Employee Laundry, Old Faithful, Teton, WY at HABS
Old Faithful Inn, Employees' Dormitory, Old Faithful, Teton, WY at HABS
Old Faithful Inn, Engineer's Bunkhouse, Old Faithful, Teton, WY at HABS
Old Faithful Inn, Fire Hose House, Old Faithful, Teton, WY at HABS
Old Faithful Inn, Girls' Dormitory, Old Faithful, Teton, WY at HABS
Old Faithful Inn, Laundry Manager's Residence, Old Faithful, Teton, WY at HABS
Old Faithful Inn, Laundry-Boiler Building, Old Faithful, Teton, WY at HABS
Old Faithful Inn, U-Plan Dormitory, Old Faithful, Teton, WY at HABS
Old Faithful Inn, Utility Shop, Old Faithful, Teton, WY at HABS
Snowlodge, 900' Southeast of Old Faithful Inn & 1050' southwest of Old Faithful Lodge, Old Faithful, Teton, WY at HABS (replaced by new Snow Lodge)
Snowlodge, Tourist Cabin Bathhouse No. 5, 100' south of Snowlodge, Old Faithful, Teton, WY at HABS
Snowlodge, Tourist Cabin Type A No. 230, 210' south of Snowlodge, Old Faithful, Teton, WY at HABS
Snowlodge, Tourist Cabin Type B No. 272, 440' southwest of Snowlodge, Old Faithful, Teton, WY at HABS
Snowlodge, Tourist Cabin Type C No. 356, 480' southeast of Snowlodge, Old Faithful, Teton, WY at HABS
Snowlodge, Tourist Cabin Type D No. 355, 485' southeast of Snowlodge, Old Faithful, Teton, WY at HABS
Snowlodge, Tourist Cabin Type E No. 222, 260' southwest of Snowlodge, Old Faithful, Teton, WY at HABS
Snowlodge, Tourist Cabin Type F No. 440, 460' southwest of Snowlodge, Old Faithful, Teton, WY at HABS
Snowlodge, Tourist Cabin Type G, 520' south of Snowlodge, Old Faithful, Teton, WY at HABS
Snowlodge, Tourist Cabin Type J No. 709, 580' southeast of Snowlodge, Old Faithful, Teton, WY at HABS
Snowlodge, Tourist Cabin Type No. 729, 700' southeast of Snowlodge, Old Faithful, Teton, WY at HABS
Snowlodge, Tourist Cabin Type O No. 419A, 480' southwest of Snowlodge, Old Faithful, Teton, WY at HABS
Snowlodge, Tourist Cabin Type P No. 239-240, 400' southwest of Snowlodge, Old Faithful, Teton, WY at HABS

Park buildings and structures on the National Register of Historic Places in Wyoming
Buildings and structures in Yellowstone National Park in Wyoming
Buildings and structures in Teton County, Wyoming
Historic American Buildings Survey in Wyoming
Historic districts on the National Register of Historic Places in Wyoming
National Register of Historic Places in Teton County, Wyoming
National Register of Historic Places in Yellowstone National Park
National Park Service rustic in Wyoming